Robert Dudley is the name of:

Surname

Robert Dudley (actor) (1869–1955), American dentist and film character actor
Robert Dudley (explorer) (1574–1649), illegitimate son of the 1st Earl of Leicester
Robert Charles Dudley (1826–1909) watercolours and lithographs
Bob Dudley (born 1954), former president & CEO of TNK-BP (2003–08) and group CEO of BP (2010–20)
Robert Dudley, 1st Earl of Leicester (1532–1588), favourite of Queen Elizabeth I of England
Robert Dudley alias Sutton (died 1539), MP
Robert H. Dudley (born 1933), Justice of the Arkansas Supreme Court

Middle name
Robert Dudley Baxter (1827–1875), English economist
Robert Dudley Edwards (1909–1988), Irish historian